Côte-d'Or (literally, "Gold Coast") is a département in the Bourgogne-Franche-Comté region of Northeastern France. In 2019, it had a population of 534,124. Its prefecture is Dijon and subprefectures are Beaune and Montbard.

History 

Côte-d'Or is one of the original 83 departments created during the French Revolution on 4 March 1790. It was formed from part of the former province of Burgundy.

Geography 

The department is part of the current region of Bourgogne-Franche-Comté. It is surrounded by the departments of Yonne, Nièvre, Saône-et-Loire, Jura, Aube, Haute-Saône, and Haute-Marne.

A chain of hills called the Plateau de Langres runs from north-east to south-west through the department to the north of Dijon and continues south-westwards as the Côte d'Or escarpment, which takes its name from that of the department. It is the south-east facing slope of this escarpment which is the site of the celebrated Burgundy vineyards. To the west of the Plateau de Langres, towards Champagne, lies the densely wooded district of Châtillonais. To the south-east of the plateau and escarpment, the department lies in the broad, flat-bottomed valley of the middle course of the Saône.

Rivers include: 
 The Saône
 The Seine rises in the southern end of the Plateau de Langres.
 The Ouche rises on the dip slope of the escarpment and flows to the Saône via Dijon.
 The Armançon rises on the dip slope of the escarpment and flows north-westward.
 The Arroux rises on the dip slope of the escarpment at the southern end of the department.

Climate 

The climate of the department is continental, with abundant rain on the west side of the central range.

Principal towns

The most populous commune is Dijon, the prefecture. As of 2019, there are 5 communes with more than 10,000 inhabitants:

Demographics 
The inhabitants of the department are called Costaloriens.

Population development since 1791:

Politics 

The President of the General Council is François Sauvadet of the Union of Democrats and Independents.

Current National Assembly Representatives

Economy 
This is a premier wine-growing region of France. It produces what are arguably the world's finest, and definitely most expensive Pinot noir and Chardonnay wines from some of the most rigorously and painstakingly (thanks to the region's many monasteries) classified vineyards in the world. Wine from the Côte-d'Or was a favorite of the emperor Charlemagne. Other crops include cereal grains and potatoes. Sheep and cattle are also raised in the department. The region is famous for Dijon mustard.

There are coal mines and heavy industry, including steel, machinery, and earthenware.
The industries most developed in Côte-d'Or are
 agriculture and food (14% of employees)
 metallurgy and metal manufacture (12% of employees)
 chemicals, rubber and plastics (12% of employees)
 pharmacy
 electrical and electronic components and equipment
 wood and paper industries.
The big works are generally in the conurbation of Dijon although biggest (CEA Valduc) is at Salives in the Plateau de Langres. There is also the SEB metal works at Selongey below the plateau on the margin of the Saône plain and the Valourec metalworking group at Montbard in the west of the department on the River Brenne near its confluence with the Armançon.
The Pharmaceutical industry has shown the greatest growth in recent years.
However, since the Dijon employment statistics zone includes the urban and administrative centre of the Burgundy region, the service sector is proportionately bigger there in relation to the industrial, than in the other three zones of Côte-d'Or.
 Reference Industry in Bourgogne website

Tourism 
Some of the major tourist attractions are the Gothic abbey church of Saint-Seine-l'Abbaye and the 11th-century Romanesque abbey church at Saulieu, as well the 12th-century Château de Bussy Rabutin at Bussy-le-Grand. The Abbey of Cîteaux, headquarters of the Cistercian Order, lies to the east of Nuits-Saint-Georges in the south of the department.

See also 

 French wine
 Cantons of the Côte-d'Or department
 Communes of the Côte-d'Or department
 Arrondissements of the Côte-d'Or department

References

External links 
  Prefecture website
  Departmental Council website 
  

 
1790 establishments in France
Departments of Bourgogne-Franche-Comté
Bourgogne-Franche-Comté region articles needing translation from French Wikipedia
States and territories established in 1790